StyleHaul was a marketing services, media, and technology company which gained recognition as an early pioneer of branded content and native advertising on digital platforms. The company was founded in 2011 by Stephanie Horbaczewski and operated as a portfolio company of RTL Group, which paid $127 million USD to acquire a controlling stake in the company in 2014.

StyleHaul was known for its large-scale influencer and paid media campaigns for major beauty brands and retailers, such as Sephora, Maybelline, and Walgreens, as well as for its high-profile talent network, which has included creators like Zoella, Ashley Tisdale, Chloe Lukasiak and Joey Graceffa.

In 2018, StyleHaul founder and CEO Stephanie Horbaczewski left the company in order to launch an artificial intelligence startup, Vody, alongside former StyleHaul Chief Technology Officer, Jeremy Houghton. In 2019, StyleHaul shuttered operations, which coincided with the arrest and guilty plea of Dennis Blieden, 29, a former StyleHaul executive and professional poker player who embezzled $22 million from the company to pay his poker debts, personal debts and bad investments in cryptocurrencies.

References

External links

Marketing companies of the United States